The European Women's Youth Handball Championship is the official competition for youth women handball national teams in Europe, managed by the European Handball Federation. It takes place every two years. Since the 2005 edition, the championship received its current name: EHF European Women's U-17 Handball Championship.

Medal summary

Medal table

See also 
 Youth World Championship
 Junior European Championship 
 Junior World Championship

References

External links 
 Eurohandball.com

 
European Handball Federation competitions
Women's handball competitions
Youth handball
Handball
1992 establishments in Europe
Recurring sporting events established in 1992